Gorakhpur is a Lok Sabha parliamentary constituency in Uttar Pradesh, India. The current member of Lok Sabha is Ravi Kishan, who has won the election as a BJP party candidate in 2019.

This constituency is considered a stronghold of Gorakhnath Math, three of whose presiding monks have been elected from it multiple times.

Vidhan Sabha constituencies
There are five Vidhan Sabha (legislative assembly) segments under this Lok Sabha constituency. These are:

Members of Lok Sabha

^By Election in 1970 & 2018.

Election results

2019 Lok Sabha elections

2018 bye-poll

2014 Lok Sabha elections

2009 Lok Sabha elections

1999 Lok Sabha elections

1962 Lok Sabha elections
 Sinhasan Singh (INC) : 68,258 votes
 Digvijai Nath (HMS) : 64,998 votes

See also
 Gorakhpur
 List of Constituencies of the Lok Sabha

References

External links
Gorakhpur lok sabha  constituency election 2019 result details

Lok Sabha constituencies in Uttar Pradesh
Politics of Gorakhpur district